"We Need the Eggs" is the seventeenth episode of the eighth season of House and the 172nd overall. It aired on April 16, 2012 on FOX.

Plot
A guy is out on a date with a woman who is not his girlfriend. She likes him and tells him she wants more. Then his eyes begin to bleed.

House is interviewing new call girls since he is losing his regular, Emily. They are going to test the blood of the man from the opening, 35-year-old Henry. The woman Henry was with; in the start of the episode, Molly, asks if she should call his girlfriend. He makes several excuses. Henry's blood panel comes back normal. A guy who had been selling a guitar seems interested in Park. Based on the strange girlfriend stuff, Adams thinks Henry has a drug problem. House sends her to search his home. At Henry's place, they find what looks like a dead woman. It turns out to be a custom-made sex doll. Henry is aware she isn't real, telling the docs that the doll is "better than a person." The team discusses whether Henry has a neurological issue. House points out that every member of the team has a "sex doll" of some kind, something that is preventing them from having a relationship. House wants them to look at the doll for bacteria. Emily tells House she is getting married and very happy. Adams and Chase find a mass in the doll's stomach. Henry quickly gives the thumbs up for them to cut open the doll.

Wilson tells House he is silly for hanging onto his call girl. Park and Adams argue over Chase and the idea of one of them dating him. Taub and one of his daughters meet a woman in the supermarket. Adams returns the doll, telling Henry she thinks the mass was just an air bubble. He drops to the floor in pain. Henry has issues with his lungs. House is spying on Emily's fiancé, with the idea being to have Dominika seduce him. Taub tells House about the new woman. They decide to look into the doll's silicon degrading. Molly shows up at the hospital and sees the doll. Henry tells her the doll is Amy and she immediately leaves. Taub admits to the new woman that he lied in the supermarket about the mother of his daughter being deceased. She accuses him of using a different baby to seduce her.

Henry envisions the doll coming to life and seducing him. But during the fantasy, she begins bleeding from the stomach. The team immediately begin working on him and realize that he is hallucinating because of liver failure. The team concludes that since Henry's doll cost $2,000 more than it is supposed to, he must have customized her somehow. Wilson tells House the way he's acting with Emily means he wants more from women down the road. Dominika attempts to seduce a man who turns out to be Emily's brother. Henry tells Adams that he had the company model the doll after a woman he had dated for four months. She broke his heart, which seems to be why he sought out the doll. Henry complains of a stiff neck and starts vomiting. Adams thinks he has meningitis. Emily confesses to House that she's not leaving the business; she's just leaving him. She's worried about him being married and tells House she thinks Dominika has feelings for him.

House figures out the problem was the Neti pot his ex gave him. It was delivering tap water to his brain, causing the infection. Henry is feeling better and mentions selling his doll online. He even asks Adams for her E-mail address. She turns him down, telling him to ask Molly out. Taub tells Park to ask out the band guy. Adams asks Chase out on a date. He says "I don't think that's really good for me right now." Park spends time with the guitar guy and they sing a duet. Henry still seems to be with his doll.

House gets a letter from immigration. Instead of showing it to Dominika, he throws it in the trash.

Reception
The Onion's AV Club gave this episode a B− rating, while Lisa Palmer of TV Fanatic gave it a 4.0/5.0 rating.

References

External links

"We Need the Eggs" at Fox.com
Medical review of "We Need the Eggs"

House (season 8) episodes
2012 American television episodes
Television episodes directed by David Straiton